Alexander L. Krongard (born December 1962), is a retired United States Navy SEAL. He retired from the United States Navy as a rear admiral in 2016 after 31 years of military service. He served as the Deputy Commander of United States Africa Command and previously commanded Naval Special Warfare Group ONE.

Early life and education
Krongard is the son of A.B. Krongard and Patricia A. Lion and was raised in Baltimore, Maryland. His father was chief executive officer and chairman of the Board of Alex. Brown & Sons, the nation's oldest investment banking firm, before serving as Counselor to the Director of Central Intelligence George Tenet. Krongard graduated from the Princeton University with a bachelor's degree in English in 1985 before joining the United States Navy.

Naval career
Krongard entered active duty with the United States Navy completing Officer Candidate School in Newport, Rhode Island in 1985. After his commission as an Ensign in the U.S. Navy, he received orders to Basic Underwater Demolition/SEAL training (BUD/S) at Naval Amphibious Base Coronado. He graduated BUD/S class 138 in June 1986. Following SEAL Tactical Training (STT) and completion of six month probationary period, he received the 1130 designator as a Naval Special Warfare Officer, entitled to wear the Special Warfare insignia also known as "SEAL Trident". 
As a Navy SEAL officer Krongard served as platoon commander in SEAL TEAM ONE from 1986 to 1990. Krongard then completed selection and training for assignment to Naval Special Warfare Development Group in 1990 where he served as element leader till 1993. Krongard completed language training in German at the Defense Language Institute in Monterey, California and transferred to Naval Special Warfare Unit TWO initially located in Machrihanish, Scotland but later moved to Stuttgart, Germany. Krongard later earned a Master of Arts degree from the National War College. Krongard  served staff and command tours including operations officer Special Operations Command Europe (SOCEUR); executive officer at SEAL Team TWO; staff officer, Joint Special Operations Command from 1999 to 2001; Commanding Officer at SEAL Team SEVEN from 2002 to 2004; deputy commander, Combined Joint Task Force-Horn of Africa at Camp Lemonnier and executive assistant to the deputy chief of naval operations for information, plans and strategy; counterterrorism director, National Security Council staff in Washington, D.C.

As a Navy Captain, Krongard assumed command of Naval Special Warfare Group ONE (NSWG1) from August 2009 to July 2011 responsible for preparing West Coast based SEAL TEAMS 1,3,5,7 for their operational deployments overseas. Krongard then received assignment as chief of staff at Special Operations Command Central. After promotion to Rear Admiral, Krongard served as deputy director for operations, United States Africa Command. Krongard retired from active duty in September 2016.

This article contains material from the United States Federal Government and is in the public domain.

Awards and decorations

References

United States Navy personnel of the Iraq War
United States Navy personnel of the War in Afghanistan (2001–2021)
Recipients of the Defense Superior Service Medal
Recipients of the Legion of Merit
United States Naval Special Warfare Command
United States Navy SEALs personnel
Recipients of the Humanitarian Service Medal
1962 births
Living people
United States Navy rear admirals (lower half)